Chauliooestrus is a genus of true flies in the family Sarcophagidae.

Species
C. denudatus (Villeneuve, 1920)

References 

Sarcophagidae
Schizophora genera